Man-Monkey may refer to:

 The Yeren
 Zip the Pinhead